Jeremiah Francis Donovan (1873 – 12 December 1949) was a member of the Queensland Legislative Council.

Early life
Donovan was born at Cork, Ireland to Cornelius Donovan and his wife Ellen (née Gallagher). Before leaving for Australia, he served with the Royal Irish Constabulary. He continued his police service in Queensland, where he joined the Queensland Police, specializing in fingerprinting.

Political career
When the Labour Party starting forming governments in Queensland, it found much of its legislation being blocked by a hostile Council, where members had been appointed for life by successive conservative governments. After a failed referendum in May 1917, Premier Ryan tried a new tactic, and later that year advised the Governor, Sir Hamilton John Goold-Adams, to appoint thirteen new members whose allegiance lay with Labour to the Council. The Council, however, continued to reject the government's money bills and in 1918 Ryan advised Goold-Adams to appoint additional Labour members, but this time he refused the request.

In 1920, the new Premier Ted Theodore appointed a further 14 new members to the Council with Donovan amongst the appointees. He served for two years until the Council was abolished in March 1922.

Personal life
Donovan was proprietor of the Transcontinental, Treasury, and City View hotels in Brisbane.

Dying in December 1949, Donovan's funeral was held at St Stephen's Cathedral and proceeded to the Toowong Cemetery.

References

Members of the Queensland Legislative Council
1873 births
1949 deaths
Australian Labor Party members of the Parliament of Queensland
Burials at Toowong Cemetery
People from Cork (city)